Willis Jones (birthdate unknown)  was an American baseball outfielder and manager in the pre-Negro leagues.

Easily confused on team rosters with his team mates Abe Jones and Bert Jones, Willis Jones appears on team rosters for the Chicago Unions and Chicago Union Giants from 1895 to 1902.

After a few more years in Chicago, in 1907 Jones started playing for the St. Paul Colored Gophers and eventually moved to the nearby Minneapolis Keystones.

He played with several popular players of the day, including Home Run Johnson, Rube Foster, Mike Moore, Bill Gatewood, Dick Wallace and George Hopkins.

References

External links

Algona Brownies players
Chicago Unions players
Leland Giants players
Minneapolis Keystones players
St. Paul Colored Gophers players
Negro league baseball managers
Year of birth missing
Year of death missing